CP Sarrià is the football section of Sant Vicenç de Sarrià Parish Center, created in 1952. It is currently the most veteran and representative football entity in the old town of Sarrià, the current district of Barcelona. The first team plays in Segona Catalana, Gr. 2, 6th tier of the Spanish football league system. It has around 24 base teams of football.

The most outstanding sporting milestone of the team was the 30 August 2014, with the dispute of final of Copa Catalunya Amateur against CE Manresa, but lost 3–0.

History 

The vicar of Sant Vicenç de Sarrià Parish Center proposed to the future president of the football section, Josep Calderó (Pitu), to create a children's football team. Then in October 1952 the Catalan Football Federation approved the statutes of the club as a football section of Parish Center.

The team has always played in territorial categories and has not had the power of other neighborhood clubs in the city, as it always lived in the shadow of the RCD Espanyol when it played in the Sarrià Stadium until 1997.

The club has only one president since the foundation: Josep Calderó Calopa, who has held office since he was 17 years old.

Stadium 

The team plays the matches at Municipal de Can Caralleu. He has enjoyed artificial turf since 1999 and all his grassroots football teams also play there.

Season to season 

1 season in Primera Catalana
7 seasons in Segona Catalana
19 seasons in Tercera Catalana
21 seasons in Quarta Catalana

Honours 

 Divisiones Regionales de Fútbol in Catalonia
 Winners (6): 1975–76, 1988–89, 1998–99, 2013–14, 2015–16, 2021–22
 Runners-up (3): 2007–08, 2012–13, 2020–21
 Copa Catalunya Amateur
 Runners-up (1): 2014

References

External links 
 Official web
 
 
 

Football clubs in Catalonia
Association football clubs established in 1952
Football clubs in Barcelona
Divisiones Regionales de Fútbol clubs
1952 establishments in Spain